The 1923–24 Torquay United F.C. season was Torquay United's third season in competitive football and their second season in the Southern League.  The season runs from 1 July 1923 to 30 June 1924.

Overview
Torquay's second season in the Southern League saw them transferred to the newly created Western Section.  Although consisting of the same mix of professional and reserve sides as the old English Section, the new league now entailed several trips into Wales.  United improved upon a satisfying first season in the Southern League by ending the season in 4th place, with the most notable performance of the campaign being an 8–0 thrashing of the Swindon Town Reserves on Boxing Day.  The Magpies also had a busy FA Cup schedule, playing eight fixtures in all before finally being knocked out in a Fourth Qualifying Round replay with Third Division South side Aberdare Athletic.

Much of United's success this season was due to some exciting new attacking players.  Helping himself to 23 goals in all competitions was former Plymouth Argyle inside forward Billy Kellock, while Cornish centre forward Percy Varco scored six goals before being signed by First Division club Aston Villa for a £200 fee.

Despite an impressive season, Torquay did not attempt to seek election to the Football League this year, deciding instead to focus their efforts on another successful season in the Southern League.

Competitions

Southern League Western Section

Standings

Matches

FA Cup

Devon Professional Cup

References

External links

Torquay United
Torquay United F.C. seasons